Trevor Charles Stamp, 3rd Baron Stamp MA MD FRCPath (13 February 1907 – 16 November 1987) was a British medical doctor and bacteriologist.

He was the son of Josiah Stamp, 1st Baron Stamp.  He succeeded his brother and father as Baron Stamp when they were killed during the war by German bombing.  He was a member of the Liberal Party in the House of Lords but later became a cross-bencher.

He was Professor of Bacteriology, at the Royal Postgraduate Medical School, University of London from 1948 to 1970.*

References 

 'STAMP’,   Who Was Who,  A & C Black,   1920–2008;     online edn,   Oxford University Press, Dec 2007

1907 births
1987 deaths
20th-century British medical doctors
English bacteriologists
Fellows of the Royal College of Pathologists
Liberal Party (UK) hereditary peers
Barons in the Peerage of the United Kingdom